Pécsi Vasutas Sportkör is a Hungarian football club from the city of Pécs, Hungary.

History
Pécsi Vasutas Sport Klub debuted in the 1945–46 season of the Hungarian League and finished fifteenth.

Name Changes 
1919–1948: Pécsi Vasutas Sport Klub
1948–1949: Pécsi Vasutas Sport Egyesület
1949–1955: Pécsi Lokomotív Sportkör
1955–1956: Pécsi Törekvés Sport Egyesület
1956–?: Pécsi Vasutas Sport Klub
?-1997: Pécsi Vasutas Sportkör
1997: merger with Pécs'96 FC
1997–2000: Pécsi Vasutas Sportkör-Pécs'96
2000–2007: Pécsi Vasutas Sportkör
2007–?: Pécsi Vasutas Sportkör-Fürge Nyuszi
2009: merger with Szentlőrinc SE
2010–: Pécsi Vasutas Sportkör

References

External links
 Profile

Football clubs in Hungary
Defunct football clubs in Hungary
1919 establishments in Hungary